Minwuntaung Wildlife Sanctuary is a protected area in Myanmar, covering . It was established in 1971. It provides habitat for Indian hog deer (Hyelaphus porcinus) and Indian muntjac (Muntiacus muntjak).

See also
Ministry of Environmental Conservation and Forestry (Myanmar)

References

External links 

Protected areas of Myanmar
Protected areas established in 1971